Abi Burton  (born 9 March 2000) is an English rugby union player. Burton represented England in rugby sevens at the 2020 Olympic Games.

Early life
From Yorkshire, the daughter of Halifax Panthers and Bradford Bulls player Danny Burton and his wife Sarah. Her twin brothers Joe and Oli Burton both played for Leeds Rhinos Academy before Joe signed for Bradford Bulls. She was a school friend of professional footballer Jamie Shackleton.

Career
Burton studied at Hartpury College captained the U18 Hartpury side that won the National Schools Sevens and came third in the 2017 Sanix World Rugby Youth Invitational Tournament in Japan.  Burton first played in the Premier 15s for Gloucester-Hartpury Women. Burton captained the England women's national rugby sevens team in the Kharkiv 7s, part of the 2019 Rugby Europe Women's Sevens Grand Prix Series. In September 2020, she joined Wasps Ladies. 

In June 2021 she was confirmed in the Great Britain Rugby Sevens squad for the delayed 2020 Summer Games in Tokyo.

Personal life
Burton suffered a period of ill health in 2022 with Autoimmune encephalitis spending 76 days in hospital including 25 days in a coma receiving plasma exchanges. She lost  in weight and had to learn to walk and talk again, suffered seizures, and was initially misdiagnosed as suffering psychotic episodes.

References

External links
 
 
 

2000 births
Living people
Rugby sevens players at the 2020 Summer Olympics
Olympic rugby sevens players of Great Britain
England international women's rugby sevens players